The Oxfordian is, in the ICS' geologic timescale, the earliest age of the Late Jurassic Epoch, or the lowest stage of the Upper Jurassic Series. It spans the time between 161.5 ± 1.0 Ma and 154.8 ± 0.8 Ma (million years ago). The Oxfordian is preceded by the Callovian and is followed by the Kimmeridgian.

Stratigraphic definitions
The Oxfordian Stage was called "Clunch Clay and Shale" by William Smith (1815–1816); in 1818 W. Buckland described them under the unwieldy title "Oxford, Forest or Fen Clay". The term Oxfordian was introduced by  Alcide d'Orbigny in 1844. The name is derived from the English city of Oxford, where the beds are well developed, but they crop out almost continuously from Dorset to the coast of Yorkshire, generally forming low, broad valleys. They are well exposed at Weymouth, Oxford, Bedford, Peterborough, and in the cliffs at Scarborough, Red Cliff and Gristhorpe Bay. Rocks of this age are found also in Uig and Skye.

The base of the Oxfordian Stage is defined as the point in the stratigraphic record where the ammonite species Brightia thuouxensis first appears. A global reference profile for the base (a GSSP) had in 2009 not yet been assigned. The top of the Oxfordian Stage (the base of the Kimmeridgian) is at the first appearance of ammonite species Pictonia baylei.

In the Tethys domain, the Oxfordian contains six ammonite biozones:
zone of Epipeltoceras bimammatum
zone of Perishinctes bifurcatus
zone of Gregoryceras transversarium
zone of Perisphinctes plicatilis
zone of Cardioceras cordatum
zone of Quenstedtoceras mariae

References

Notes

Literature
; 1829: Tableau théorique de la succession et de la disposition la plus générale on Europa, des terrains et roches, qui composent l'écorce de la terre, Paris.
; 2004: A Geologic Time Scale 2004, Cambridge University Press.

External links
GeoWhen Database - Oxfordian
Jurassic-Cretaceous timescale, at the website of the subcommission for stratigraphic information of the ICS
Stratigraphic chart of the Upper Jurassic, at the website of Norges Network of offshore records of geology and stratigraphy

 
 
01
Geological ages
1827 introductions
Culture in Oxford